Kumudben Manishankar Joshi (31 January 1934 – 14 March 2022) was an Indian politician.

Biography
She was the Governor of the Indian state of Andhra Pradesh from 26 November 1985 to 7 February 1990. She was the second female Governor of the state after Sharda Mukherjee. She also became Deputy Minister of Information and Broadcasting (October 1980 – January 1982) and Deputy Minister of Health and Family Welfare (January 1982 – December 1984).

Joshi was a member of the Rajya Sabha thrice, from 15 October 1973 to 2 April 1976, 3 April 1976 to 2 April 1982 and from 3 April 1982 to 25 November 1985. She was also the General Secretary, Gujarat P.C.C.

Soon after taking charge, she travelled to all the state's 23 districts and often outside, to create a record of sorts - that of being more active than her 13 predecessors in Hyderabad's Raj Bhavan. Between 26 November 1985 and 30 September 1987 she travelled to the districts on 108 occasions, and outside the state 22 times. N. T. Rama Rao, the then Chief Minister and his partymen saw this as an attempt by Joshi to build a stronger base for the Congress.

Controversies 
Joshi reacted by granting a number of interviews to local newspapers in Hyderabad. She dismissed the charges as "rubbish" and said, "it is below my dignity to reply to such criticism."

Death
She died in Changa Dhanori village near Gandevi, on 14 March 2022, at the age of 88.

References 

1934 births
2022 deaths
Governors of Andhra Pradesh
Indian National Congress politicians from Gujarat
Women state governors of India
Rajya Sabha members from Gujarat
Women in Gujarat politics
Union deputy ministers of India
Women in Andhra Pradesh politics
20th-century Indian women politicians
20th-century Indian politicians
Women union ministers of state of India
Women members of the Rajya Sabha